Sénah Mango (born December 13, 1991 in Lomé) is a Togolese footballer who plays as a central defender for UE Santa Coloma in Andorra.

Career
Sènah began his career in his youth with Olympique Marseille and was a part of the 2008 U-16 French League winning side. He was promoted to the Marseille reserve team at the age of 17 and played his first reserve team game in September 2007.

Sènah spent the 2011/2012 season on loan at Ligue 2 club AS Monaco. The loan deal included an option to buy. He saw first-team action while on loan at Uzès Pont du Gard in 2013.

He spent the 2013–14 season at French third-division club Luzenac, where he played a part in the team's eventual promotion to Ligue 2 at the end of the season, though the club was unable to compete in Ligue 2 for financial reasons. His contract with Marseille expired at the end of the 2014 season and he became an unattached free agent.

Sénah signed with Boulogne for the 2014/15 season. In July 2017 he joined El Ejido. He played there for one season, before joining CD Don Benito. Seven months later, on 31 January 2019, he left the club by mutual consent.

International
Mango played his first international game on 10 September 2008 against Zambia national football team and scored his first goal on 11 February 2009 against Burkina Faso national football team.

Honours
 2007 : Champions de France des – de 16 (OM)

References

External links
 
 OM Profile 
 

1989 births
Living people
Togolese footballers
Togo international footballers
French footballers
Olympique de Marseille players
AS Monaco FC players
ES Uzès Pont du Gard players
Luzenac AP players
US Boulogne players
UE Sant Julià players
Championnat National players
Championnat National 2 players
Championnat National 3 players
Segunda División B players
Primera Divisió players
Association football defenders
Togolese expatriate footballers
Togolese expatriate sportspeople in France
Expatriate footballers in France
Togolese expatriate sportspeople in Spain
Expatriate footballers in Spain
Expatriate footballers in Andorra
21st-century Togolese people
Togolese expatriate sportspeople in Monaco
Togolese expatriate sportspeople in Andorra
Expatriate footballers in Monaco